Dancing in Manhattan is a 1944 American film directed by Henry Levin.

It was originally called Tonight We Dance.

Plot
A garbage truck driver, Eddie Martin (Fred Brady) from Manhattan finds a bag of $5,000 during his rounds.  He decides to take his sweetheart, Julie Connors (Jeff Donnell) for a wild night on the town, buying and spending on things they've always wanted, but never thought they would have.  Problem 1 is that the money actually belonged to a blackmailing hood named Steve Crawford (William Wright).  Problem 2 is when the police start asking uncomfortable questions about why the marked money they hoped to trap Crawford with, is now in the possession of Martin and Conners.

Cast
 Fred Brady as Eddie Martin
 Jeff Donnell as Julie Connors
 William Wright as Steve Crawford
 Ann Savage as Valerie Crawford
 Cy Kendall as Inspector J. J. Kirby
 Carla Balenda as Billie

References

External links
 
 Dancing in Manhattan at TCMDB

1944 films
American musical comedy films
Films directed by Henry Levin
Columbia Pictures films
1944 musical comedy films
American black-and-white films
1940s American films